The Mortimer Fleishhacker House, also known as Green Gables, the Fleishhacker Estate, or the Mortimer Fleishhacker Country House is a historic estate with an English manor house, built between 1911 and 1935, and located at 329 Albion Avenue in Woodside, California. The house has been listed on the National Register of Historic Places since September 26, 1986.

History

The Fleishhacker family 
Mortimer Fleishhacker Sr. (1866–1953) was a lumber, paper, banking and hydroelectric power entrepreneur and he co-founded (with his brother Herbert Fleishhacker) the Great Western Power, which later became part of Pacific Gas and Electric and City Electric Company, American River Electric Company, Truckee River General Electric Company. He served as a director of the San Francisco Opera, San Francisco Symphony, the Museum of Modern Art, Temple Emanu-El, the Hebrew Orphanage, and others. Fleishhacker had a home at 2418 Pacific Street in San Francisco, California.

House 
In 1911, Fleishhacker Sr. and his wife Bella Gerstle Fleishhacker (1875–1963), commissioned Charles Sumner Greene of the architectural firm Greene and Greene to design a country home for them on a 45-acre property. This was the largest of all Greene and Greene designs. The interior of the house was designed by Elsie de Wolfe of New York and the San Francisco design house of Vickery, Atkins and Torrey.

When designing the home, Greene also took in to account the design of the landscaping and the driveway. The main house is two stories tall, and was created in an English manor-style with an imitation thatch roof, a gunite exterior, and consisting of ten bedrooms.

Landscaping 
The garden was Italian style and features four levels of terracing and a lily pond, a Roman reflecting pool, and a piano-shaped swimming pool. This may have been the first free-form swimming pool designed in California. The property's rolling green lawns were inspired by the Fountains Abbey of Studley Royal Park in 18th-century England, which Greene had visited in 1909. The garden has natural materials used and design elements that complement the landscape such as terraces, walls, arcades, balustrades, and planting urns.

Current 
Over the years, Fleishhacker family built out the estate, adding new structures and land. As of 2019, the estate is 74 acres in size. The property has been used to host family weddings, corporate retreats, and historic summits - including the 20th birthday of the United Nations in 1965. The estate was used and remained in the Fleishhacker family for five generations. As of 2019, the estate was placed for sale.

Theranos CEO Elizabeth Holmes rented a house on the property from March 2021 until November 2022.

See also 

 National Register of Historic Places listings in San Mateo County, California
Herbert Fleishhacker

References

External links 
 An Interview with Delia Ehrlich (granddaughter of Mortimer) from 640 Heritage Preservation Foundation

National Register of Historic Places in San Mateo County, California
Houses on the National Register of Historic Places in California
Landscape design history of the United States